Fahalanj (also Romanized as Fahālanj and Fahālonj; also known as Fehlunj) is a village in Nakhlestan Rural District, in the Central District of Tabas County, South Khorasan Province, Iran. At the 2006 census, its population was 1,258, in 336 families.

References 

Populated places in Tabas County